Ercheia quadriplaga is a species of moth of the family Erebidae. It is found in Asia, including Sulawesi.

References

Moths described in 1865
Ercheiini